Wang Fei (born 28 July 1987) is a road cyclist from China. She represented her nation at the 2007 UCI Road World Championships.

References

External links
 profile at Procyclingstats.com

1987 births
Chinese female cyclists
Living people
Place of birth missing (living people)